The Xincai–Biyang Expressway, often abbreviated as Xinyang Expressway and designated S38 in Henan's expressway system, is  long regional expressway in Henan, China. 

The expressway was completed and opened in 2011.

Exit list

References

Expressways in Henan
Transport in Henan